The Stokes Baronetcy, of Lensfield Cottage in the Parish of Saint Paul in the Town of Cambridge, was a title in the Baronetage of the United Kingdom. It was created on 6 July 1889 for the Irish mathematician and physicist George Stokes. The title became extinct on the death of the second Baronet in 1916.

Stokes baronets, of Lensfield Cottage (1889)
Sir George Gabriel Stokes, 1st Baronet (1819–1903)
Sir Arthur Stokes, 2nd Baronet (1858–1916)

References

Extinct baronetcies in the Baronetage of the United Kingdom